Does You Inspire You is the debut studio album by American indie band Chairlift, released on July 22, 2008 on Kanine Records and reissued in 2009 by Columbia Records.

Release
After briefly going out of print on its original Kanine Records label, the album was re-released by Columbia Records on April 21, 2009 with two additional tracks not included on the original release and a longer version of "Make Your Mind Up". The lead single "Bruises" was featured in an iPod commercial, and the video for "Evident Utensil" was nominated for an award in the "Breakthrough Video" category at the 2009 MTV Video Music Awards.

Critical reception

Does You Inspire You received mostly positive reviews from contemporary music critics. At Metacritic, which assigns a normalized rating out of 100 to reviews from mainstream critics, the album received an average score of 68, based on 16 reviews, which indicates "generally favorable reviews".

Alex Miller of NME praised the album stating, "Swathed as it is in the kind of ’80s arrangements of flutes and chiming guitars that have rarely been allowed beyond Carol Decker’s lushest, most velveteen fantasies, this album is an open goal to accusations of trend-following revivalism."

As of April 2009 the album has sold 11,000 copies in United States.

Track listing

References 

2008 debut albums
Chairlift (band) albums
Columbia Records albums
Kanine Records albums